Jonathan Wolff (born October 23, 1958) is an American composer.

Biography
Wolff was born in Louisville, Kentucky, and attended Atherton High School. He is well known for creating the theme and music for the television series Seinfeld. Wolff is also the composer for about 75 other TV series, including Will & Grace, Who's the Boss?, Married... with Children, The Hughleys, The King of Queens, and Reba.

References

External links
 
 Jonathan Wolff, Public Speaker
 

American television composers
Living people
Musicians from Louisville, Kentucky
1958 births
Atherton High School alumni